Catoosa may refer to:
 Catoosa, Oklahoma
 Catoosa County, Georgia
 Catoosa County Schools, in Georgia
 Catoosa Springs, Georgia
 Catoosa High School
 Catoosa County Library
 Catoosa Blue Whale
 Catoosa Wildlife Management Area on the Upper Cumberland Plateau of Tennessee